Nedelya Point (‘Nos Nedelya’ \'nos ne-'de-lya\) is a sharp ice-free point at the southwest extremity of Ivanov Beach on the north coast of Livingston Island in the South Shetland Islands, Antarctica, projecting 300 m into Barclay Bay. It is linked by a chain of rocks to Cutler Stack, located 310 m to the north-northwest. The feature was visited by a field party from the British base camp Station P during the summer season 1957/58. It is part of the Antarctic Specially Protected Area ASPA 126 Byers Peninsula, situated in one of its two restricted zones.

The point is named for Bulgarian educator Nedelya Petkova (1826–1894).

Location
British mapping was done in 1968, Chilean in 1971, Argentine in 1980, Spanish in 1993 and Bulgarian in 2005, 2009 and 2017.

Maps
 Península Byers, Isla Livingston. Mapa topográfico a escala 1:25000. Madrid: Servicio Geográfico del Ejército, 1992.
 L.L. Ivanov et al. Antarctica: Livingston Island and Greenwich Island, South Shetland Islands. Scale 1:100000 topographic map. Sofia: Antarctic Place-names Commission of Bulgaria, 2005.
 L.L. Ivanov. Antarctica: Livingston Island and Greenwich, Robert, Snow and Smith Islands. Scale 1:120000 topographic map.  Troyan: Manfred Wörner Foundation, 2009.

Gallery

Notes

References
 Nedelya Point. SCAR Composite Gazetteer of Antarctica.
 Bulgarian Antarctic Gazetteer. Antarctic Place-names Commission. (details in Bulgarian, basic data in English)

External links
 Nedelya Point. Copernix satellite image

Headlands of Livingston Island
Bulgaria and the Antarctic